Henry Petty-Fitzmaurice, 3rd Marquess of Lansdowne,  (2 July 178031 January 1863), known as Lord Henry Petty from 1784 to 1809, was a British statesman. In a ministerial career spanning nearly half a century, he notably served as Home Secretary and Chancellor of the Exchequer and was three times Lord President of the Council.

Background and education
Lansdowne was the son of Prime Minister William Petty, 1st Marquess of Lansdowne (better known as the Earl of Shelburne) by his second marriage to Lady Louisa, daughter of John FitzPatrick, 1st Earl of Upper Ossory. He was educated at Westminster School, the University of Edinburgh, and Trinity College, Cambridge.

Political career
He entered the House of Commons in 1802 as member for the family borough of Calne and quickly showed his mettle as a politician. In February 1806 he became Chancellor of the Exchequer in Lord Grenville's Ministry of All the Talents, being at this time member for the University of Cambridge, but he lost both his seat and his office in 1807. In 1809 he became Marquess of Lansdowne, and in the House of Lords and in society he continued to play an active part as one of the Whig leaders. His chief interest was perhaps in the question of Roman Catholic emancipation, a cause which he consistently championed, but he sympathised also with the advocates of the abolition of the slave trade and with the cause of popular education. Lansdowne, who had succeeded his cousin, Francis Thomas Fitzmaurice, as 4th Earl of Kerry in 1818, took office with Canning in May 1827 and was Secretary of State for the Home Department from July of that year until January 1828.

He was Lord President of the Council under Earl Grey and then under Lord Melbourne from November 1830 to August 1841, with the exception of the few months in 1835 when Sir Robert Peel was prime minister. He held the same office during the whole of Lord John Russell's ministry (1846–1852), and, having declined to become prime minister, sat in the cabinets of Lord Aberdeen and of Lord Palmerston, but without office. In 1857 he refused the offer of a dukedom, and he died on 31 January 1863. Lansdowne's social influence and political moderation made him one of the most powerful Whig statesmen of the time; he was frequently consulted by Queen Victoria on matters of moment, and his long official experience made his counsel invaluable to his party. In Kenmare, he donated the site of the Holy Cross Church to the town. In 1864, Father John O'Sullivan (1806-74) built the church on that site.

Other public appointments
Lansdowne chaired the inaugural meeting of the London Statistical Society, and was its first president (1834–1836). He later served a second term (1842–1844). (See The Times 15 and 17 March 1834, and John Bibby (1987) HOTS: History of Teaching Statistics.)

Family
Lord Lansdowne married Lady Louisa Fox-Strangways, daughter of the 2nd Earl of Ilchester, in 1808. They had three sons and one daughter:

Lady Louisa (d. 12 June 1906) married Hon. James Kenneth Howard, son of Thomas Howard, 16th Earl of Suffolk. They had a son Kenneth (married Lady Emily Bury, daughter of the Earl of Charleville) and daughter Winifrede.
William Thomas Petty-FitzMaurice, Earl of Kerry (30 Mar 1811 - 21 Aug 1836)
Henry Petty-FitzMaurice, 4th Marquess of Lansdowne (7 Jan 1816 - 5 July 1866)
Hon. Bentinck Yelverton (1855 - 1892), died unmarried.

Louisa died in April 1851, aged 65, and Lord Lansdowne in January 1863, aged 82. His eldest son, the Earl of Kerry, had predeceased him and he was succeeded in the marquessate by his eldest surviving son, Henry. The latter was the father of Henry Petty-FitzMaurice, 5th Marquess of Lansdowne, who also became a distinguished statesman.

References

External links

 

1780 births
1863 deaths
Members of the Privy Council of the United Kingdom
Alumni of the University of Edinburgh
Alumni of Trinity College, Cambridge
British Secretaries of State
Chancellors of the Exchequer of Great Britain
Children of prime ministers of the United Kingdom
Fellows of the Royal Society
Garter Knights appointed by William IV
Lord-Lieutenants of Wiltshire
Lord Presidents of the Council
Petty, Lord Henry
Petty, Henry
Presidents of the Royal Statistical Society
Rectors of the University of Glasgow
Petty, Lord Henry
Petty, Lord Henry
Petty, Lord Henry
Lansdowne, M3
Petty, Lord Henry
Petty, Lord Henry
Henry
Presidents of the Zoological Society of London
3
Members of the Judicial Committee of the Privy Council
Earls of Kerry
Leaders of the House of Lords